The Feisnitz is a river in Bavaria, Germany. It flows into the Röslau near Arzberg.

See also
List of rivers of Bavaria

Rivers of Bavaria
Rivers of Germany